Lego Club Magazine (formerly known as Brick Kicks in the US and Bricks 'n' Pieces in the UK then Lego MANIA Magazine and simply Lego Magazine until 2008) was the official magazine for Lego, or, more specifically, the Lego Club.  It features many things such as LEGO products, special offers, comics, games, contests, modeling tips, and more. In 2017, LEGO Club Magazine ended with a final issue for January/February and was eventually rebranded as LEGO Life Magazine. There are various types of Lego Magazines, such as:
 Lego Magazine - A PLAYbook featuring comics, building ideas, cool creations, and games. First seen in May/June 2002.
 Lego BrickMaster Magazine - The "premium" version of Lego Magazine with more pages and exclusive content.  First seen in November 2004.  Starting in November 2007, exclusive sets based on Indiana Jones, Star Wars, Bionicle, and City were released for members of Brickmaster.
 Bionicle - Bionicle comics, mailed with Lego Magazine and Brickmaster Magazine. Bionicle comics were replaced with Hero Factory comics in Fall 2010.
 Lego Mania Magazine - Earlier version of Lego magazine, last seen in March/April 2002.
 School Edition - A new edition with educational articles relating to Lego themes and products, games, activities and others. First seen in January/February 2007.
 Lego Club Jr. - A new edition for children 6 and younger. First seen in November/December 2008.

List of magazines (Winter 1987 – present)

Brick Kicks issues
(Winter 1987 – Fall 1994)

Lego Mania Magazine issues
(Winter 1994-March/April 2002)

Lego Magazine issues
(May-June 2002 - March-April 2008)

Lego Club Magazine issues
(May/June 2008 - January 2017)

See also
 List of magazines in Denmark
Lego Life

External links
 

Club Magazine
Magazines published in Denmark
English-language magazines
Magazines established in 1987
1987 establishments in Denmark